Herophila is a genus of longhorn beetles of the subfamily Lamiinae, containing the following species:

 Herophila fairmairei (Thomson, 1857)
 Herophila tristis (Linnaeus, 1767)

References

Phrissomini